Giuseppe Pepe (born 27 January 1949) is an Italian sports shooter. He competed in the mixed skeet event at the 1976 Summer Olympics.

References

1949 births
Living people
Italian male sport shooters
Olympic shooters of Italy
Shooters at the 1976 Summer Olympics
Sportspeople from Rome